Harrison Township is one of the sixteen townships of Scioto County, Ohio, United States.  The 2010 census counted 4,548 people in the township.

Geography
Located in the eastern part of the county, it borders the following townships:
Madison Township - north
Bloom Township - east
Vernon Township - southeast corner
Porter Township - south
Clay Township - west

No municipalities are located in Harrison Township, although the unincorporated community of Minford lies along the border with Madison Township.

Name and history
Named in honor of General William Henry Harrison, it is one of nineteen Harrison Townships statewide.

Harrison Township was established March 6, 1832.

Government
The township is governed by a three-member board of trustees, who are elected in November of odd-numbered years to a four-year term beginning on the following January 1. Two are elected in the year after the presidential election and one is elected in the year before it. There is also an elected township fiscal officer, who serves a four-year term beginning on April 1 of the year after the election, which is held in November of the year before the presidential election. Vacancies in the fiscal officership or on the board of trustees are filled by the remaining trustees.

References

External links
County website

Townships in Scioto County, Ohio
Townships in Ohio